The Central African Republic Swimming Federation, is the national governing body for the sport of swimming in the Central African Republic.

References

External links
  

National members of the African Swimming Confederation
Sports governing bodies in the Central African Republic
Swimming in the Central African Republic
2009 establishments in the Central African Republic
Sports organizations established in 2009